is a Japanese mystery manga series written by Chihiro and G.O. and illustrated by Tatsuhiko. It began serialization in Square Enix's seinen manga magazine Monthly Big Gangan under Gangan Comics imprint on April 25, 2014 and ends on October 24, 2015.  The manga has been licensed in North America by Yen Press.

Reception
Rebecca Silverman from Anime News Network wrote that the plot of the manga looks borrowed from successful series like Another, Arisa and Secret; which unfortunately makes it less scary. Although, she noted that the characters are highly individual, and praised Tatsuhiko for his interesting approach in character design. She found death images very impressive but said that the characters' death itself didn't look any special to her. In a review of the first English volume Cain Walter from Fandom Post wrote that the death scenes are well executed in the manga, which makes it above than the average manga of the same genre. He appreciated that the author didn't waste time introducing characters. He further mentioned that the English translation by Yen Press looks smooth and modern to him.

References

External links
  at Monthly Big Gangan 
 

Seinen manga
Gangan Comics manga
Yen Press titles
Mystery anime and manga